Mohammad Salahuddin is a Bangladeshi cricket coach and former assistant coach of the Bangladesh and Singapore national cricket teams. A graduate of Jahangirnagar University, he played domestic cricket for six years until injury ended his career and he became a part-time coach in 1997.

Coaching career
After a number of successes he joined the international side as a fielding coach in 2005 until leaving in 2010 to work in Malaysia as a university team coach. He is a former coach of the Bangladesh Premier League side Comilla Victorians and led them to their victory in 2015–16 Bangladesh Premier League, and also coached then Sylhet Royals to the race to the final stage of the 2013 BPL. He also coached Chittagong Vikings in 2016, helping them on their way to the eliminator. Though no longer working with the national side, several Bangladeshi cricketers consider him a mentor including Shakib Al Hasan, Tamim Iqbal, Mushfiqur Rahim and Mominul Haque. He was selected as the head coach again for Comilla Victorians in 2021–22 Bangladesh Premier League.

References

External links

Living people
Bangladeshi cricket coaches
Jahangirnagar University alumni
Indian Premier League coaches
Coaches of the Singapore national cricket team
Year of birth missing (living people)
Bangladesh Premier League coaches